Rhynchodoras castilloi is a species of thorny catfish endemic to Venezuela where it is found in the middle to lower Apure River.  It is found only in deep water.  This species grows to a length of  SL.

References 
 

Doradidae
Fish of Venezuela
Endemic fauna of Venezuela
Fish described in 2007